The Detroit and Howell Railroad (D&H) is a defunct railroad organized in 1864 to build a line connecting Howell and Detroit in southeast Michigan.

The company incorporated on June 17, 1864 at a meeting of Howell businessmen in New Hudson, though articles were not filed until September 21. A stock issue of $400,000 was authorized for construction of the proposed  line. By 1866 enough money had been raised to conduct engineering surveys, and grading commenced the following year. The start of construction in Plymouth, Michigan, on February 6, 1867 was marked by a ceremony where a cherry wood tie was fashioned on the spot and laid on the center line of the road. The area was known as Shearers Cut.

By early 1870, the D&H had completed  of line, although it remained unopened.

On March 29, 1870, the D&H merged with the Howell and Lansing to form the Detroit, Howell and Lansing under James F. Joy. The merger agreement was filed April 11, 1870, marking the end of the D&H. However, as of 2011 much of the D&H's route is still in use by CSX as part of its Plymouth Subdivision.

Notes

References 

Railway companies established in 1864
Railway companies disestablished in 1870
Defunct Michigan railroads
Predecessors of the Pere Marquette Railway
Predecessors of CSX Transportation
American companies established in 1864
1864 establishments in Michigan